Edmond Haggard Madison (December 18, 1865 – September 18, 1911) was a U.S. Representative from Kansas.

Born in Plymouth, Illinois, Madison attended the common schools. He taught school. He moved to Wichita, Kansas, in 1885. He studied law. He was admitted to the bar in 1888 and commenced the practice of his profession in Dodge City, Kansas. He served as prosecuting attorney of Ford County, Kansas from 1889 to 1893. He was appointed judge of the thirty-first judicial district of Kansas on January 1, 1900, and served until September 17, 1906, when he resigned to become a candidate for Congress.

Madison was elected as a Republican to the Sixtieth, Sixty-first, and Sixty-second Congresses and served from March 4, 1907, until his death in Dodge City, Kansas on September 18, 1911. He was interred in Maple Grove Cemetery.

See also
List of United States Congress members who died in office (1900–49)

References

Edmond H. Madison, late a representative from Kansas, Memorial addresses delivered in the House of Representatives and Senate frontispiece 1913

1865 births
1911 deaths
Kansas state court judges
Republican Party members of the United States House of Representatives from Kansas
19th-century American politicians
19th-century American judges